Joyce Chepkoech Korir is a Kenyan politician who since 2017 is the Woman Representative for Bomet County in the 12th Parliament of Kenya. She was also the first female mayor of Bomet Municipality and served in this position between 2007 and 2013.

Background and education 
Korir attended Tendwet Primary School between 1987 and 1995. Later on she enrolled at Mugango Secondary for her schooling between 1996 and 1999 before joining the Kenya Institute of Legal Studies in 2004 from where she obtained a Certificate of Legal Studies. She then received a Diploma in County Governance from the Jomo Kenyatta University of Agriculture and Technology in 2014.

Career 
In 2007, Korir was the elected Councillor for Singorwet Ward as well as a Deputy Mayor. In 2011, she was elected the first female Mayor of Bomet Municipality and served as Mayor until 2013.

Under the Jubilee Party in 2017, Korir, who was then Bomet County Assembly Deputy Speaker contested for and won the office of Woman Representative in Kenya's 12th Parliament replacing Cecilia Ng'etich.

Personal life 
Korir was married to Leonard Korir who died in 2016.

See also 
 List of members of the National Assembly of Kenya, 2017–present
 Jubilee Party

References 

Living people
People from Bomet County
Jomo Kenyatta University of Agriculture and Technology alumni
21st-century Kenyan women politicians
21st-century Kenyan politicians
Jubilee Party politicians
Members of the National Assembly (Kenya)
Year of birth missing (living people)
Kenyan women representatives
Women mayors of places in Kenya
Members of the 12th Parliament of Kenya